The 2002 international cricket season was from April to September 2002.

Season overview

April

India in the West Indies

New Zealand in Pakistan

May

Sri Lanka in England

June

New Zealand in the West Indies

Pakistan in Australia

NatWest Tri-Series 2002

July

Bangladesh in Sri Lanka

India in England

August

Morocco Cup 2002

PSO Tri-Nation Tournament 2002

References

External links
2002 season on ESPN Cricinfo

2002 in cricket
International cricket competitions in 2002